Nassarius striatulus is an extinct species of sea snail, a marine gastropod mollusk in the family Nassariidae, the Nassa mud snails or dog whelks.

Subspecies
 Nassarius striatulus striatulus (Eichwald, 1829) †
 Nassarius cabrierensis ovoideus (Locard, 1886) is a synonym of Tritia ovoidea (Locard, 1886)

Description
The shell grows to a length of 12 mm.

Distribution
This species occurs in the Atlantic Ocean off the Western Sahara.

References

 Landau B.M.; Silva C.M. da & Gili C. (2009). The Early Pliocene Gastropoda (Mollusc) aof Estepona, southern Spain. Part 8, Nassariidae. Palaeontos. 17: 1-101

External links
 Fischer, P.; Tournouër, R. (1873). Invertebrés fossiles du Mont Léberon. In: Gaudry, A.; Fischer, P.; Tournouër, R. Animaux fossiles du Mont Léberon (Vaucluse). F. Savy, Paris, pp. 113-172, pls. 16–21
 

Nassariidae
Gastropods described in 1878